Commius elegans is a species of shield bug in the tribe Diemeniini found in Australia.

References

External links 

 Commius elegans at Atlas of Living Australia
 Commius elegans at gbif.org

Pentatomidae
Insects described in 1805
Insects of Australia